This is a list of brown dwarfs. These are objects that have masses between heavy gas giants and low-mass stars. The first isolated brown dwarf discovered was Teide 1 in 1995. The first brown dwarf discovered orbiting a star was Gliese 229 B, also discovered in 1995. The first brown dwarf found to have a planet was 2M1207, discovered in 2004. , more than 2,800 brown dwarfs have been identified. An isolated object with less than about 13 Jupiter masses is technically a sub-brown dwarf or rogue planet.

Because the mass of a brown dwarf is between that of a planet and that of a star, they have also been called planetars or hyperjovians. Various catalog designations have been used to name brown dwarfs. Brown dwarfs with names ending in a letter such as B, C, or D are in orbit around a primary star; those with names ending in a lower-case letter such as b, c, or d, may be exoplanets (see Exoplanet naming convention).

Some exoplanets, especially those detected by radial velocity, can turn out to be brown dwarfs if their mass is higher than originally thought: most have only known minimum masses because the inclination of their orbit is not known. Examples include HD 114762 b (>11.68 MJ), Pi Mensae b (>10.312 MJ), and NGC 2423-3 b (>10.6 MJ).

Confirmed brown dwarfs orbiting primary stars 

Sorted by increasing right ascension of the parent star. Brown dwarfs within a system sorted by increasing orbital period.

Some brown dwarfs listed could still be massive planets.

Unconfirmed brown dwarfs

Sorted by increasing right ascension of the parent star. Brown dwarfs within a system sorted by increasing orbital period.

Some brown dwarfs listed could still be massive planets.

Field brown dwarfs 

Data updated from and merged from previous tables

Former brown dwarfs

See also 

 Lists of astronomical objects
 List of exoplanets

References

External links 

 
 

brown dwarfs, list of
Binary stars
List